Wabowden Water Aerodrome  was located adjacent to Wabowden, Manitoba, Canada.

References

Defunct seaplane bases in Manitoba